Hopkins County is a county located in the western part of the U.S. state of Kentucky. As of the 2020 census, the population was 45,423. Its county seat is Madisonville. Hopkins County was created December 9, 1806 from Henderson County.  It was named for General Samuel Hopkins, an officer in both the American Revolutionary War and War of 1812, and later a Kentucky legislator and U.S. Congressman.

The Madisonville, Kentucky Micropolitan Statistical Area includes all of Hopkins County.

The topography ranges from flatlands along the broad river valleys of the Pond River, Tradewater River, and Green River, to hilly and rolling land in the southern and central parts of the county. Coal mines operate in the southern part of Hopkins County and agriculture is a mainstay in the northern part. Major crops are soybeans, corn, and tobacco. Along with coal, resources include oil and natural gas.

History
The earliest inhabitants were prehistoric Native Americans who lived, hunted, and farmed in the region. One of their settlements was a rough stone structure on Fort Ridge, which has since been destroyed by strip mining for coal. Some of the early settlers were Revolutionary War veterans who received land grants for their service from Virginia in the area southwest of the Green River. Among these was Baron Von Steuben, a Prussian officer who had trained George Washington's Continental Army at Valley Forge during the winter of 1776–77. He had received a grant of several thousand acres in the northwest part of the county. According to tradition, Von Steuben was wounded in an Indian attack on his first visit to Kentucky. He then quit-claimed his property. Nevertheless, a salt spring on his grant came to be known as Steuben's Lick. By the 1880s, the community that grew up around the lick was known as Manitou.

Roads in the county often followed animal trails that led to salt and mineral springs. The major traces were those which connected the county seat at Madisonville with Henderson to the north, Hopkinsville to the south, and Russellville to the southeast. Numerous other trails led to the mills and ferries on the Pond and Tradewater Rivers and their tributaries.

On January 3, 1829, Ashbyburg in the northeastern part of the county was incorporated. Located on the Green River, it thrived as a steamboat landing during the 19th century. Other antebellum communities included Nebo, Kentucky, northwest of Madisonville, and Charleston, Kentucky, named after "Free Charles," a black freedman who operated a tavern in the southwest part of the county.

Hopkins County was divided by the American Civil War. Union supporters joined the 35th Kentucky Infantry (Mounted), a regiment recruited locally in late 1863 by James M. Shackelford, while in 1862 Adam Rankin Johnson had recruited Confederate troops for his 10th Kentucky Cavalry Regiment. The courthouse in Madisonville was burned by Kentucky Confederates led by Gen. Hylan Benton Lyon on December 17, 1864, as they passed through western Kentucky, since it was being used to house Union soldiers.

However, the harsh policies imposed by the occupying Union armies caused much resentment and served to increase the sympathy for the Confederate cause. Because of that, the majority of the white population voted for the Democratic Party well into the 20th century.

Farming was the major occupation in Hopkins County for most of the 19th century, with tobacco the leading crop. Around 1837 local blacksmith James Woolfolk found an outcropping of coal on his land.

Post-Civil War
John Bayless Earle, whom the town of Earlington, Kentucky was named for, opened the first coal mine in the county in 1869. Mining did not become a major industry until the Louisville & Nashville Railroad pushed its line southward from Henderson through Madisonville and toward Nashville in 1870.

Two years later, the Elizabethtown and Paducah Railroad (now Paducah and Louisville Railway) entered the county from the east. Many new communities were first established as railroad stops, including Crofton, Hanson, Mortons Gap, Nortonville, and White Plains. Dawson Springs, in the southwestern part of the county, began to thrive in the 1880s as a health resort, but its popularity had faded by the time of the Great Depression of the 1930s.

Economy and politics: late 20th century to present
Beginning in 1968, the majority white voters began to favor Republican Party presidential candidates. Since 2000, they have consistently voted for Republican candidates for the presidency (see table below), and increasingly so in local and statewide elections as well.

By 1970, Hopkins County was the second-largest producer of coal in the Western Coal Field, after Muhlenberg County, and the third-largest coal producer in the entire state after Muhlenberg and Pike County. In 1971 the county also ranked fifth in Kentucky in oil production.

Coal and oil-related businesses were major county employers by 1990. Development of resources was aided by the construction of the north–south Pennyrile Parkway and the east–west Western Kentucky Parkway through the county by the early 1970s. In 1987 farms occupied 41 percent of the land area, with 72 percent of farmland under cultivation.

Geography

Adjacent counties
 Webster County  (northwest)
 McLean County  (northeast)
 Muhlenberg County  (southeast)
 Christian County  (south)
 Caldwell County  (southwest)

Demographics

As of the census of 2000, there were 46,519 people, 18,820 households, and 13,399 families residing in the county. The racial makeup of the county was 92.02% White, 6.21% Black or African American, 0.19% Native American, 0.34% Asian, 0.02% Pacific Islander, 0.37% from other races, and 0.86% from two or more races.  0.91% of the population were Hispanic or Latino of any race.

There were 18,820 households, out of which 31.60% had children under the age of 18 living with them, 56.30% were married couples living together, 11.90% had a female householder with no husband present, and 28.80% were non-families. 25.80% of all households were made up of individuals, and 11.50% had someone living alone who was 65 years of age or older.  The average household size was 2.43 and the average family size was 2.91.

In the county, the population was spread out, with 24.20% under the age of 18, 8.30% from 18 to 24, 28.20% from 25 to 44, 24.60% from 45 to 64, and 14.70% who were 65 years of age or older.  The median age was 38 years. For every 100 females there were 91.00 males.  For every 100 females age 18 and over, there were 87.70 males.

The median income for a household in the county was $30,868, and the median income for a family was $36,794. Males had a median income of $31,400 versus $20,014 for females. The per capita income for the county was $17,382.  About 13.60% of families and 16.50% of the population were below the poverty line, including 24.40% of those under age 18 and 10.50% of those age 65 or over.

Education
Two public school districts operate in the county. Hopkins County Schools serves most of the county, except for most of the city of Dawson Springs, which is covered by the Dawson Springs Independent School District. The Dawson Springs district operates a single K-12 facility, Dawson Springs Community School.

As of July 2017, Hopkins County Schools' adopted a tobacco-free policy that stated that all tobacco products, including alternative nicotine products and vapor products were prohibited for use by anyone, anywhere on district grounds.  The ban extends to outdoor events and inside vehicles on district grounds.  The policy also applies to community groups that use school facilities and to field trips and any school-sponsored activity.

Elementary schools

 Earlington Elementary
 Grapevine Elementary
 Hanson Elementary
 Jesse Stuart Elementary
 Pride Elementary
 Southside Elementary
 West Broadway Elementary
 West Hopkins School
 Dawson Springs Community School
 Christ The King Elementary

Middle schools
 Browning Springs Middle School
 James Madison Middle School
 South Hopkins Middle School
 West Hopkins School
 Dawson Springs Community School

High schools
 Hopkins County Central High School
 Madisonville North Hopkins High School
 Dawson Springs Community School
 Grace Baptist

Community College
 Madisonville Community College

Media
 The Madisonville Messenger, established in 1917, is the daily newspaper (Tues-Sun) and website (the-messenger.com) serving Hopkins, Webster and Muhlenberg counties.
 SurfKY News Group, Inc. was established in 2008, this online news service (surfky.com) serves Hopkins County and Western Kentucky.

Communities

Cities

 Dawson Springs (partly in Caldwell County)
 Earlington
 Hanson
 Madisonville (county seat)
 Mortons Gap
 Nebo
 Nortonville
 St. Charles
 White Plains

Census-designated place
 Manitou

Unincorporated communities

 Anton
 Ashbyburg
 Barnsley
 Charleston
 Coiltown
 Dalton
 Daniel Boone
 Ilsley
 Richland
 Wicks Well

Politics

See also

 National Register of Historic Places listings in Hopkins County, Kentucky

References

External links
 Hopkins County Schools
 Dawson Springs Independent School District
 Hopkins County Sheriff's Office
 Historical Society of Hopkins County

 
Kentucky counties
1806 establishments in Kentucky
Populated places established in 1806